József Ferenc Kulcsár (born 1954) is a Hungarian politician, member of the National Assembly (MP) for Zugló (Budapest Constituency XXII) from 2010 to 2014. He was a member of the Defence and Internal Security Committee since May 17, 2010.

Personal life
He is married and has two children.

References

1954 births
Living people
Fidesz politicians
Members of the National Assembly of Hungary (2010–2014)
Politicians from Budapest